Ahçik(Armenian: Աղջիկ Aghjik), Kilise Kapısı(tr)  is a popular folk story in Turkey, about an impossible love between Turkish man and an Armenian girl from Elazığ.

References

External links
http://www.idefix.com/kitap/ahcik-yucel-cakmak/tanim.asp?sid=DJOX37WUJ3YM2RRD5DST
http://www.arkadas.com.tr/kitap/ahcik/9789759019358
http://www.gunisigigazetesi.net/y-664-b-Ahcik--25-02-2008.html
http://www.haber7.com/kultur/haber/299364-mustafa-ve-ahcikin-turkusu-video

See also
Sari Gelin
Suzan Suzi
Ahçik Çıkmış Kilisenin Taşına
Esmer Ahçik

Turkish folk songs
Year of song unknown
Songwriter unknown